Parrado is a surname. Notable people with the surname include:

Agustín Parrado y García (1872–1946), Spanish Cardinal of the Roman Catholic 
Javier Parrado (born 1964), Bolivian classical composer
Julio Anguita Parrado (1971–2003), Spanish war correspondent
María Parrado (born 2001), Spanish singer
Nando Parrado (born 1949), Uruguayan survivors of Uruguayan Air Force Flight 571 
Rocio Parrado Guarnizo (born 1982), Colombian professional racing cyclist

References